Big C , is a grocery and general merchandising retailer headquartered in Bangkok, Thailand. Big C is as of 2016 Thailand's second-largest hypermarket operator after Lotus's (formerly known as Tesco Lotus). It has operations in four countries, namely Thailand, Vietnam, Laos and Cambodia.

The company was founded by Central Group in 1993 and the first Big C opened on Chaengwattana Road in Bangkok in 1994, prior to the company becoming listed on the Stock Exchange of Thailand (SET) in 1995.  Big C operates 153 hypermarkets, 63 Big C markets, and 1,018 Mini Big C stores.

History

Beginning

Central Group opened the Central Superstore at the Wong Sawang intersection in 1993 as a Central Department Store subsidiary. It began selling groceries from Central Supermarket and private label clothing from Central Department Store and Central Trading, under the self-service store concept. The Big C brand was first launched on 15 January 1994, the name being an abbreviation of "Big Central". The first Big C store was opened on Chaengwattana Road in Bangkok.

1990s
Save One Rangsit was changed to the Big C Supercenter in 1995, and was the chain's first store outside Bangkok. The same year, Central Superstore Company Limited changed its name to Big C Supercenter Public Company Limited, and was listed on the Stock Exchange of Thailand (SET) (SET: BIGC) with S.K. Garment PLC holding a majority stake.

Big C launched the single floor store concept at Bangphlee in 1996, integrating a super center 12,000 m2 floor space and a  layout and decor to facilitate shopping. The efficient design contributed to lower operating costs.

Merger with Groupe Casino
After the Asian financial crisis of 1997, Big C Supercenter PCL formed a business alliance with France-based Groupe Casino, known for its Géant stores. Groupe Casino bought 530 million shares of a capital increase in 1999, making them the largest shareholder after the company's recapitalization. After securing the controlling stake in Big C, Groupe Casino sold Big C's garment business in order to concentrate only on retail activity to strengthen the efficiency of the operation.

2000s
Big C extended its business hours from 08:00 to midnight daily and launched the Big C website in 2000. Two years later, Big C launched a hard-discount supermarket chain, "Leader Price by Big C", an affiliate store similar to the Leader Price  brand of Groupe Casino. In the same year, Big C launched its first credit card, "Big C Credit Card", and "Big C Hire-Purchase". Big C Foundation was also launched in 2002, with its main objectives including providing necessary assistance and support for children in terms of education, and offering opportunities for education to those suffering as a result of social abuses or the drug trade.

Big C developed and expanded the "Compact Store" concept in 2005. Compact Stores each require an investment of between 300 and 400 million baht, and have an average retail space of 5,000-6,000 square metres, whereas Big C's standard stores have retail space of about 10,000 square metres and require an investment of between 600-700 million baht. In May 2005, the "Big C Shopper Card" was launched, which was a hire-purchase card.

In 2006, Leader Price by Big C was remodeled into "Mini Big C", a proximity store format offering 24-hour service. Big C launched yet another new brand store format in July 2010 called "Big C Junior", which is sized midway between a compact store and a supermarket.

Global branding

"Big C" was used for the first time outside Thailand at the end of 2003, with the rebranding of three Cora hypermarkets in Vietnam. The stores were owned by Vindemia, a Groupe Bourbon company in Réunion. Casino took control of Vindemia, and the Big C Supercenter banner is used for these stores.

In 2010, Big C announced in Thailand that it would open its first store in Laos, inside The New Taladsao Shopping Mall in Vientiane, in late 2012.

Carrefour acquisition

In November 2010, Big C won a bid to buy the 42 Carrefour branches in Thailand for €868 million (35.4 billion baht). After the acquisition, Groupe Casino, whose Thai subsidiary is Big C Supercenter PCL, owned 111 hypermarkets versus Tesco's 87. However, if other retail formats are included, Tesco is larger with some 704 stores nationwide.

Big C and Carrefour branches in Thailand had their first co-promotion in January 2011, before Carrefour Thailand stores were rebranded as Big C. In March 2011, Carrefour Suwintawong was the first Carrefour store to be rebranded as a Big C.

Ownership under Thai Charoen Corporation
Groupe Casino SA agreed in February 2016 to sell its stake in Thai hypermarket operator Big C for €3.1 billion (US$3.46 billion) to Thai billionaire, Mr Charoen Sirivadhanabhakdi. His holding company, TCC Group, will buy Casino's 58.6% stake in Big C Thailand for 252.88 baht a share (US$7.10), a price that values Big C close to US$5.86 billion. The sale, expected to completed by 31 March, will allow Casino to reduce its debt level by €3.3 billion. The retailer launched a €4 billion deleveraging plan in 2016 which included selling its stake in Big C as well as Vietnam retail assets.

Store formats

 Big C Supercenter A Big C Supercenter is a hypermarket targeting mid-to-low income customers offering value through combination of low prices, wide selection, clean and efficient shopping environment, and good service. There are 105 Big C Supercenters in Thailand as of 2016.
 Big C Extra is a hypermarket targeting mid- to high-income customers. It offers a wider range of premium fresh and dry food items, imported products, and wine than a Big C Supercenter.. There are 15 Big C Extra stores in Thailand (2016).
  Big C Plaza is a Plaza Style, under Big C Rama 4 Renovation New Building.
  Big C Foodplace is a supermarket with their first branch located at Gateway at Bang Sue, opened at 30 November 2018 with another Big C Foodplace branch opened at Samyan Mitrtown on 20 September 2019 as 24/7 store.

 Big C Market is a supermarket format, targeting mid- to low-income customer. The smaller size of a Big C Market enables penetration in areas outside the main district of a province. It is designed to be the largest modern retailer in its service area. The stores differ from traditional supermarkets that concentrate mainly on food by offering a range of products from fresh food to electronics. As of 2016, there are 31 Big C Markets scattered around Thailand.

 Mini Big C Mini Big C is a "proximity store" format targeting mid- to low-income customers. Mini Big C stores carry a larger assortment than typical convenience stores and offer selected promotional items. The average size of a Mini Big C store is around 80–250 m2, open 24/7. There are 394 Mini Big C stores in Thailand (2016).
 Pure by Big C is a drugstore format offering pharmaceutical, health, beauty, and wellness products. Most of Pure drugs, Promotion, Blond Kid, ores are in Big C hypermarkets and Big C Markets. There are 134 Pure outlets in Thailand (2016).

Cambodia, Laos and Vietnam stores

Cambodia
Big C opened its first Cambodian store in Poipet on 4 December 2019. The company invested 300 million baht to build Big C Poipet on 20 rai. The hypermarket is 8,000 m2, with 3,000 m2 of sales area and rental space of 5,000 m2. Big C plans to open five or six Big C hypermarket stores in Phnom Penh and Siem Reap over the next two years.

Laos
41 M-Point Mart stores in Vientiane were rebranded to Mini Big C in June 2019. There are currently 51 Mini Big C branches operating in Vientiane.

Vietnam
Big C has 35 stores throughout Vietnam and all of them are owned by Central Group, which will begin rebranding under its GO! retail brand. Berli Jucker, which owns a majority stake in Big C in Thailand, Laos and Cambodia, will invest one billion baht in 2020 to open three MM Mega Market wholesale stores in Vietnam next year, bringing the total number of MM Mega Market stores there to 21 branches.

References

External links

 Big C Thailand
 Big C Vietnam
 BigC $ave - The discount coupons online website for use in stores of Thailand.

1993 establishments in Thailand
Central Group
Thai brands
Companies based in Bangkok
Companies listed on the Stock Exchange of Thailand
Convenience stores
Discount stores
Retail companies established in 1993
Retail companies of Thailand
Supermarkets of Thailand